Dream a Little Dream 2 is a 1995 direct-to-video American teen comedy film, starring Corey Feldman, Corey Haim, Robyn Lively and Stacie Randall. Directed by James Lemmo, this film is the sequel to the 1989 film Dream a Little Dream. It is one of seven films featuring The Two Coreys.

Plot 
The pair of Bobby Keller and Dinger each find themselves with a pair of seemingly ordinary sunglasses. But, this is no normal pair of shades — once two people are wearing the set, one can manipulate the other physically to do whatever their mind wishes to.

The set of sunglasses were part of an experiment, and the original owners of the products will stop at nothing to get them back from Bobby and Dinger.

Production notes 
Dream a Little Dream 2 was filmed in Los Angeles, California.

References

External links 
 

1995 direct-to-video films
1990s teen comedy films
American independent films
American sequel films
American teen comedy films
CineTel Films films
Direct-to-video comedy films
Direct-to-video sequel films
1990s English-language films
Films shot in Los Angeles
1995 independent films
1995 films
Films directed by James Lemmo
1990s American films